Zhu Yuanyuan (born 18 March 1974) is a Chinese actress.

Zhu is noted for her roles as Tao Hua and Song Yu in the film and television series The Forest Ranger and The Forest Ranger respectively.

Early life
Zhu was born and raised in Shibei District of Qingdao, Shandong, where she finished from Qingdao Art School in 1992, her ancestral home in Yixing, Wuxi, Jiangsu. Zhu graduated from Central Academy of Drama in 1997, where she majored in acting.

Acting career
Zhu began her career by appearing in small roles in 1995, such as Spring Breeze in the Evening, Modern Urban Heroine, and Waiting Hall.

In 1998, Zhu won the Best TV Actress Award at the Beijing Chunyan Awards and Favorite Actress Award at the Golden Eagle Awards for her performance in Loquacious Zhang Damin's Happy Life.

Zhu's first film role was uncredited appearance in the film Bey, Our 1948 (1999).

In 2000, Zhu played the role of Soong Ching-ling in Sun Yat-Sen, for which she won the Favorite Actress Award at the CCTV Television Awards. That same year, she earned her Hundred Flowers Award for Best Actress nomination for her performance as Li Yun in Beautiful Family.

In 2001, Zhu had a supporting role in Records of Kangxi's Travel Incognito 2, a historical television series starring Zhang Guoli and Deng Jie.

For her role as Song Yu in Romantic Matter, Zhu was nominated for the Golden Eagle Award for Favorite Actress and Chinese Television Flying Apsaras Award for Outstanding Actress.

In 2005, Zhu starred in The Forest Ranger, a film adaptation based on the novel of Zhang Ping's The Attacker , she received nominations at the Shanghai Film Critics Awards, Golden Rooster Awards and Huabiao Film Awards, and won the Female Actor Award at the Golden Phoenix Awards.

In 2010, Zhu co-starred with Jet Li, Gwei Lun-mei and Wen Zhang in Ocean Heaven as the Aunt Chai. She was nominated for Best Supporting Actress Award at the Hundred Flowers Awards.

In 2012, Zhu played the lead role in Love in the Family, for which she earned her second Golden Eagle Awards for Favorite Actress.

Personal life
Zhu married her university friend Xin Baiqing in 2004, their daughter was born in August 2008.

Filmography

Film

Television

Drama

Awards

References

External links

1974 births
Actresses from Qingdao
Living people
Central Academy of Drama alumni
21st-century Chinese actresses
20th-century Chinese actresses
Chinese stage actresses
Chinese film actresses
Chinese television actresses